Amphidromus thachi is a species of medium-sized air-breathing tree snail, an arboreal gastropod mollusk in the family Camaenidae.

Distribution 
Central Vietnam, Khánh Hòa Province.

Habitat 
In and around trees.

Etymology 
This species is named after Vietnamese malacologist, Dr. Nguyễn Ngọc Thạch.

References 

thachi
Gastropods described in 2015